Neemuch railway station is a main railway station of Neemuch city, Madhya Pradesh. Its code is NMH. Neemuch is B – category railway station of Western Railway Zone on the Ajmer — Ratlam section. The station consists of three platforms. Neemuch is well connected to Ratlam, Ujjain via Nagda and Kota, Bundi via Chittorgarh.

References

Railway stations in Neemuch district
Ratlam railway division
Neemuch